Pratella is a comune (municipality) in the Province of Caserta in the Italian region Campania, located about  north of Naples and about  northwest of Caserta.

Pratella borders the following municipalities: Ailano, Ciorlano, Prata Sannita, Presenzano, Sesto Campano, Vairano Patenora.

References

Cities and towns in Campania